Loanda may mean:

Loanda, Paraná, a city in Brazil
Loanda, Gabon, a city in Gabon
Luanda, capital city of Angola (old spelling)
Loanda, a housing development in Newry, Northern Ireland